James Lowell Oakes (February 21, 1924 – October 13, 2007) was a United States circuit judge of the United States Court of Appeals for the Second Circuit and previously was a United States district judge of the United States District Court for the District of Vermont.

Education and career
Born on February 21, 1924, in Springfield, Illinois, Oakes received an Artium Baccalaureus degree in 1945 from Harvard University and a Bachelor of Laws in 1947 from Harvard Law School. He served as a law clerk for Judge Harrie B. Chase of the United States Court of Appeals for the Second Circuit from 1947 to 1948 and from 1949 to 1950. He was in private practice in San Francisco, California from 1948 to 1949. He was in private practice in Brattleboro, Vermont from 1950 to 1966 and from 1969 to 1970. He was a member of the Vermont Senate from 1961 to 1965. He was Attorney General of the State of Vermont from 1967 to 1969.

Federal judicial service
Oakes was nominated by President Richard Nixon on March 31, 1970, to a seat on the United States District Court for the District of Vermont vacated by Judge Ernest W. Gibson Jr. He was confirmed by the United States Senate on April 23, 1970, and received his commission on April 24, 1970. His service terminated on June 5, 1971, due to his elevation to the Second Circuit.

Oakes was nominated by President Nixon on May 3, 1971, to a seat on the United States Court of Appeals for the Second Circuit vacated by Judge Sterry R. Waterman. He was confirmed by the Senate on May 20, 1971, and received his commission on May 27, 1971. He served as Chief Judge from 1989 to 1992 and served as a member of the Judicial Conference of the United States for the same period. He assumed senior status on June 30, 1992. His service terminated on October 13, 2007, due to his death in Martha's Vineyard, Massachusetts.

Other service and legacy
Oakes served as a member of the Vermont Law School Board of Trustees from 1976 until 1994. His many incisive opinions helped to shape Vermont's singular role in the development of environmental law, including his ruling in Conservation Society of Southern Vermont v. Volpe (the Route 7 Case) and Southview Associates v. Bongartz (the Deeryard Case).

References

Sources

External links

1924 births
2007 deaths
Judges of the United States District Court for the District of Vermont
United States district court judges appointed by Richard Nixon
Judges of the United States Court of Appeals for the Second Circuit
United States court of appeals judges appointed by Richard Nixon
20th-century American judges
Vermont Attorneys General
Vermont state senators
California lawyers
Politicians from Springfield, Illinois
Harvard Law School alumni
People from Brattleboro, Vermont